This is a list of notable Nigerian actors.

Actors 

 Ramsey Nouah
 Richard Mofe Damijo
 Osita Iheme
 O. C. Ukeje
 Jim Iyke
 Ebisan Arayi
 Olumide Oworu
 Adewale Akinnuoye-Agbaje
 Bovi
 Olu Jacobs
 Tope Tedela
 Mike Bamiloye
 Pete Edochie
 Chiwetel Ejiofor
 Saint Obi
 Lateef Adedimeji
 Broda Shaggi
 John Boyega
 Dele Odule
 Femi Branch
 Efa Iwara
 Wasiu Alabi Pasuma
 Femi Adebayo
 Francis Odega
 Odunlade Adekola
 Muyiwa Ademola
 Yemi Ajibade
 Jimoh Aliu
 Fred Amata
 Chet Anekwe
 Okey Bakassi
 Saheed Balogun
 Joseph Benjamin
 Yul Edochie
 Segun Arinze
 Alex Ekubo
 Deyemi Okanlawon
 Ken Erics
 Mike Ezuruonye
 Sola Fosudo
 Chinedu Ikedieze
 Hakeem Kae-Kazim
 Ifeanyi Emmanuel Igboke
 Daniel Etim Effiong
 Rotimi Salami
 Tosin Igho
 Jide Kosoko
 Ayo Makun
 Chuma Mmeka
 Zack Orji
 Ali Nuhu
 Dele Odule
 Dede One Day
 Clem Ohameze
 John Okafor
 Dayo Okeniyi
 Babatunde Omidina
 Emeka Ossai
 Nkem Owoh
 David Oyelowo
 Afeez Oyetoro
 Kola Oyewo
 Adebayo Salami
 Sunday Omobolanle
 Yemi Shodimu
 Ime Bishop Umoh
 Nonso Diobi
 Charles Inojie
 Desmond Elliot
 Kanayo O. Kanayo
 Segun Arinze
 Emeka Ike
 Sam Dede
 Kenneth Okonkwo
 Uzee Usman
 Chidi Mokeme
 Zubby Michael

Actresses 

 Alex Asogwa
 Liz Da-Silva
 Genevieve Nnaji
 Omotola Jalade Ekeinde
 Sola Sobowale
 Funke Akindele
 Joke Silva
 Rita Dominic
 Mercy Johnson
 Kate Henshaw
 Ini Edo
 Nse Ikpe Etim
 Nancy Isime
 Yvonne Jegede
 Caroline Danjuma (maiden name: Caroline Ekanem)
 Lilian Esoro
 Adesua Etomi
 Oghenekaro Itene
 Bimbo Ademoye
 Efe Irele
 Mary Lazarus
 Uzo Aduba
 Tonto Dikeh
 Liz Benson
 Kehinde Bankole
 Fathia Balogun
 Tomi Odunsi
 Stephanie Okereke Linus
 Nafisa Abdullahi
 Adunni Ade
 Ayo Adesanya
 Taiwo Ajai Lycett
 Nikki Amuka-Bird
 Rosaline Meurer
 Regina Askia
 Dorcas Shola-Fapson
 Monalisa Chinda
 Chioma Chukwuka
 Abiodun Duro-Ladipo
 Megalyn Echikunwoke
 Adesua Etomi-Wellington
 Carmen Ejogo
 Tamara Eteimo
 Hadiza Gabon
 Regina Daniels
 Rahama Sadau
 Muma Gee
 Shan George
 Biola Adebayo
 Adebimpe Oyebade
 Uyoyou Adia
 Kate Henshaw
 Chika Ike
 Carol King
 Bisi Komolafe
 Annie Macaulay-Idibia
 Lola Margaret
 Iyabo Ojo
 Sharon Ooja
 Sophie Okonedo
 Chioma Okoye
 Oge Okoye
 Moji Olaiya
 Kiki Omeili
 Racheal Oniga
 Bimbo Oshin
 Patience Ozokwor
 Helen Paul
 Idowu Philips
 Toni Tones
 Mary Uranta
 Bukky Wright
 Folake Olowofoyeku
 Sharon Ooja
 Ngozi Ezeonu
 Beverly Naya
 Beverly Osu
 Abimbola Craig
 Ruth Kadiri
 Weruche Opia
 Yvonne Orji
 Toyin Abraham
 Mercy Aigbe

See also
Cinema of Nigeria

References

 
Actors
Nigerian
Actors